Termessa orthocrossa is a moth in the subfamily Arctiinae. It was described by Turner in 1922. It is found in Australia, where it has been recorded from New South Wales and Queensland.

References

Moths described in 1922
Lithosiini